Utran railway station is a small railway station on the Western Railway network in the state of Gujarat, India. It serves Utran town of Surat district. Passenger and MEMU trains halt here.

Trains

 59049/50 Valsad - Viramgam Passenger
 69149/50 Virar - Bharuch MEMU
 59439/40 Mumbai Central - Ahmedabad Passenger
 59441/42 Ahmedabad - Mumbai Central Passenger
 69111/12 Surat - Vadodara MEMU
 69171/72 Surat - Bharuch MEMU
 69109/10 Vadodara - Surat MEMU

Gallery

References

See also
 Surat district

Railway stations in Surat district
Vadodara railway division
Transport in Surat